Dream Well may refer to:

 Dream Well (film), a 2009 Hungarian romantic comedy film
 Dream Well (horse) (foaled 1995), a Thoroughbred racehorse